Walter Haggas (1 April 1881 – 14 November 1959) was an English cricketer. He was a wicket-keeper who played first-class cricket for Lancashire. He was born in Werneth, Oldham, Lancashire and died in Macclesfield, Cheshire.

Haggas made two first-class appearances for the side, within a week of each other in May 1903. He made six runs in two innings as a tail-end batsman and took three catches behind the wicket.

His father, Stell, appeared for Yorkshire and Lancashire between 1878 and 1885.

References

1881 births
1959 deaths
English cricketers
Lancashire cricketers
People from Oldham